Sergey Vasilyevich Parkhomenko (born October 8, 1976), known professionally as Seryoga, is a Belarusian-Ukrainian rapper and the owner of the KingRing record label.

Career
Parkhomenko was born in Gomel, Belarus. The moniker "Seryoga" derives from his first name, Sergey, and is one of the nickname forms commonly used for that name.

Seryoga released his first solo single "Загубили Лялю" (Ruined Laila) in the summer of 2002. In 2003, the record label "Монолит" (Monolit) released the CD Maxi single of "Загубили Лялю" with 5 tracks in Russia and Belarus.

In February 2004, Seryoga started a show on the Ukrainian music channel М-1. In April 2004, the record label MFG/BMG Ukraine released Seryoga's debut solo album "Мой двор: свадьбы & похороны" (My neighborhood: weddings & funerals) in Ukraine. The album was simultaneously released in the Belarus by the record label Go Records. The album came out several weeks later in Russia, where it was titled "Мой двор. Спортивные частушки" (My neighborhood. Sports chastushki).

His third single was "Чёрный Бумер" (Chyorniy Bumer, meaning Black Bimmer). The "Чёрный Бумер" music video was shot in the summer of 2004 by Ukrainian director Vladimir Yakimenko (Pistolet Film) and premiered on September 15, 2004, in Kyiv, Ukraine. In 2005, the music video for the song "King Ring" was shot in Kyiv. The song was written for the feature film "Shadowboxing" and included on its soundtrack. In 2006, the film Day Watch came out in theaters, the sequel to Night Watch from two years earlier. The film's soundtrack featured Seryoga's song "Мел судьбы или Песня Тамерлана" (Mel sudby ili Pesnya Tamerlana, English: "Chalk of Destiny or Timur's song") as the theme song.

In Germany, Seryoga collaborated on the song "2 Kaiser" with the German rapper Azad. Seryoga then worked with the German rapper Megaloh and also recorded the song "In Da City" with German rap group Culcha Candela. Seryoga's song King Ring was chosen by Rockstar Games to be the background music of the Third Trailer for their video game Grand Theft Auto IV, titled Move up, Ladies and is also featured in the game on its "Vladivostok FM" radio station. He was also contracted to compose a track for The Music of Grand Theft Auto IV (the music CD included with the special edition of GTA IV) entitled Liberty City: The Invasion, which is also featured on the in-game radio station.

Political position
In 2021, Seryoga has publicly declared his support to the authoritarian ruler of Belarus, Alexander Lukashenka, whom he described as “the keeper of the [political] balance [in Belarus]”.

Despite a large number of documented human rights abuses in Belarus in 2020–21, Seryoga describes the place as "peaceful and orderly", with "infrastructure that works" and "a large number of people with happy faces".

Later, in July 2021 he said that he would like to shake Alexander Lukashenka's hand and also praised Soviet dictator Joseph Stalin calling him “a great humanist".

Discography

Studio albums 
 2004 – Moy Dvor
 Moy Dvor: Svad'by i pokhoriny (Ukraine and Belarus) (2004)
 Moy Dvor: Sportivnye chastushki (Russia) (2004)

Track list:
 Govorila mama vecherom synochku (Momma told the son at night)
 Kukla (Doll) – feat. Max Lorens
 Ryzhy (Red-Head)
 Pesenka o slesare shestogo razryada
 Gimn boleyshikov FC "Spartak"
 Suka-iuda
 Vykhodila Manya zamuzh (Manya Got Married)
 A na tantspole netu svobodnykh mest (There's no space on the dancefloor)
 Chorniy Bumer (Black Beamer)
 Deti Moskvy (Kids Of Moscow)
 Голуби (Doves) – feat. Satsura
 Zagubili lyalyu

 2005 – Дискомалярия (Discomaliaria)
 Дискомалярия (standard edition) (2005)
 Дискомалярия (deluxe edition) (2005)
 Дискомалярия: Большая порция (2006)
 $1000000: Самая Большая Порция (collectors edition) (2007)

Track list:
 Intro
 2 Kaiser (feat. Azad)
 Barbeque
 Gangsta No More
 Mr. Perfect (feat. Rapturous)
 Disco Malaria (feat. Eveleena)
 Old Schooler (feat. Sacura)
 I'm In Love With A Russian Boy
 Mon Beat (feat. Skuril)
 Disco Malaria (Russian Version)
 Superbotanic full track
 Kukla full track
 Gangsta Rap (feat. Eveleena)
 Kepka (A Tribute to Kangol 504)
 King Ring

 2007 – Не для продажи (Ne Dlya Prodazhi) (as Ayvengo)
 2008 – Хроника парнишки с гомельских улиц (Khronika Parnishki S Gomel'skikh Ulits)
Track list:
 Sidi i slushay (Sit And Listen)
 Skit ot Khaby Kazanskogo (Skit from Haba Kazansky)
 Parnishka s ulitsy (Guy From Streets)
 Dobav' skorost' (Add The Speed)
 Moyo pokoleniye (My Generation) – feat. Satsura
 Mne s toboyu khorosho (It's Good With You)
 Show dolzhno prodolzat'sya (The Show Must Go On)
 Quasimodo Skit
 Quasimodo – feat. Satsura
 Korabli (Ships)
 Mon Ami – feat. Max Lorens
 Vtorzheniye (The Invansion) (GTA IV soundtrack)
 Vyshe neba tol'ko nebo (Sky is the limit) – feat. Aleksandr Marshal
 Igra (Game)
 Chiki (Chicks)
 Olya i SPID (Olya & AIDS) – feat. Vladimir Zhirinovsky / China-town (hidden track)

Compilations 
 2005 – А на танцполе нет свободных мест (remix album)
 2006 – Russia's No.1
 2008 – The Best of Seryoga

Singles 

 2003 – Загубили Лялю
 2004 – Чёрный бумер
 2005 – Возле дома твоегo feat. Макс Лоренс & Сацура
 2005 – Дискомалярия
 2005 – KING RING
 2005 – Barbeque
 2005 – Diskomalaria VLS
 2006 – 2 Kaiser (feat. Azad)
 2007 – Летняя песня feat.Макс Лоренс
 2007 – Рэп vs. СПИД (feat. Владимир Жириновский)
 2007 – $1000000
 2007 – Я рэп feat. St1m
 2007 – Gangsta No More CDS
 2007 – Gangsta No More VLS
 2007 – Чики
 2008 – Мне с тобою хорошо
 2008 – Шоу Должно Продолжаться (Музыка Queen – Show must go on) (гимн телешоу «Король Ринга–2» на Первом канале).
 2008 – Про Модных Девчонок (Г. П. Т. R’N’B) (feat. «Подиум»)
 2008 – Liberty City. The Invasion (OST GTA IV)
 2008 – Твой город не спит (DJ Shevtsov & DJ Miller ft. Макс Лоренс)
 2009 – Тектоник
 2009 – Выше неба feat. РИ
 2009 – Кружим
 2009 – Кружим 2
 2009 – К Элизе feat.ПМ
 2010 – С новым годом,СНГ! feat.Маша Малиновская
 2010 – Иваново
 2011 – Осколки
 2013 – Tuman
 2013 – Lubliuy

Videos 
 2003 – Загубили Лялю
 2003 – Кукла
 2004 – Чёрный Бумер
 2004 – Песенка о слесаре шестого разряда
 2004 – Бум! (TT-34 featuring Seryoga)
 2005 – King Ring
 2005 – Дискомалярия
 2005 – Возле дома твоего
 2005 – $1000000
 2006 – Мел судьбы
 2006 – 2 Kaiser (featuring Azad)
 2007 – RAP vs. СПИД (featuring ВВЖ)
 2007 – Ein Teil von Mir (Sido featuring Seryoga & B-Tight)
 2007 – Я – рэп (featuring St1m)
 2007 – Gangsta No More
 2007 – Отчего (Ri featuring Seryoga)
 2007 – Аггробабруйск
 2007 – Чики
 2007 – Про модных девчёнок и не модных ребят (featuring Podium)
 2008 – Позови меня (featuring Alexa)
 2008 – Шоу должно продолжаться
 2008 – Liberty City: The Invasion
2009 – Кружим
2009 – К Элизе (feat. ПМ)
2009 – C Новым годом, СНГ! (feat. Маша Малиновская)
2009 – Холодно (feat. Ri)
2009 – Корабли

References

External links
Official website
Seryoga on IMEEM
Seryoga @ MySpace.com
Seryoga's first US performances
Microsite for the single "2 Kaiser" with Seryoga feat. Azad
Exclusive interview for MTV germany on mtv.de (German language)
Seryoga on Russmus.net: lyrics and translations
Grand Theft Auto IV third trailer

1976 births
Living people
People from Gomel
Ukrainian hip hop musicians
Belarusian rappers
Ukrainian rappers
Ukrainian people of Belarusian descent